Keith Macfarlane Dyce,  DVM&S, BSc, MRCVS (1926–2014) was a 20th-century British veterinarian who served as Dean of the Dick Vet School from 1980 to 1984. He was an expert on dog anatomy.

Life
He was born in Edinburgh on 24 June 1926. He studied Science at Edinburgh University then trained as a vet at the Dick Vet School in Edinburgh graduating BSc in 1947. He then lectured in the anatomy department at the Royal Veterinary College in London, gaining a doctorate (DVM&S) in 1958.

In the academic year 1965/66 he was visiting Professor of Dog Anatomy at Cornell University in the US. In 1967 he became Professor of Veterinary Anatomy at the University of Utrecht in the Netherlands. In 1974 he returned to Edinburgh as Professor of Anatomy at his alma mater the Dick Vet, and was additionally created Dean of Faculty in 1980 in succession to Professor Ian Beattie.

Dyce was married for almost sixty years, and had a son and two grandsons. He retired in 1984, but continued writing and contributing to veterinary medicine long after that. In 2009 the fourth edition of his textbook was published, which he had written despite then being in his 80s. He died at St Columba's Hospice on 12 of January 2014, surrounded by his family. He was cremated at Warriston Crematorium.

Publications

Textbook of Veterinary Anatomy – at least 4 editions – with Wolfgang Sack and C. J. G. Wensing
Essentials of Bovine Anatomy (1971 – with Wensing)

Artistic recognition

Dyce was one of twenty "shadow portraits" created in the Summerhall building of the college, depicting former Principals. The portraits are now in the Easter Bush buildings.

References

1926 births
2014 deaths
People in health professions from Edinburgh
Academics of the University of Edinburgh
Scottish veterinarians